"D'ye ken John Peel?" – which translates to "Do you know John Peel?" – is a famous Cumberland hunting song written around 1824 by John Woodcock Graves (1795–1886) in celebration of his friend John Peel (1776–1854), an English fox hunter from the Lake District. The melody is said to be a contrafactum of a popular border rant, "Bonnie Annie." A different version, the one that endures today, was musically adapted in 1869 by William Metcalfe (1829–1909), the organist and choirmaster of Carlisle Cathedral. The tune etymology has a long history that has been traced back to 1695 and attributed to adaptations – one in particular, from the 20th century, the 1939 jingle, "Pepsi-Cola Hits the Spot."

History 
John Graves, who wrote it in Cumbrian dialect, tinkered with the words over the years and several versions are known. George Coward, a Carlisle bookseller who wrote under the pseudonym Sidney Gilpin, rewrote the lyrics with Graves' approval, translating them from their original broad Cumberland dialect to Anglican; and in 1866, he published them in the book, Songs and Ballads of Cumberland. Another song written by Graves mentions one of John's brothers, Askew Peel (1789–1854), a horsedealer who also lived in Caldbeck.

"D'ye ken John Peel?" was first sung in 1824 in Gate House in Caldbeck in John Graves’ home to the tune of the Border rant "Bonnie Annie." A different musical version was composed in 1869 by William Metcalfe, a conductor and composer – and lay clerk of Carlisle Cathedral. His arrangement – lauded as more musical than the traditional melody – became popular in London and was widely published. In 1906, the song was published in The National Song Book, but with a tune closer to Bonnie Annie – and that version is the most widely known today. English counties have no official anthem. However, "D'ye ken John Peel?" is commonly regarded as a kind of unofficial anthem of Cumberland and the region.

Etymology and other uses 
British musicologist Ann Gilchrist (1863–1954) and Canadian folklorist Edith Fowke (1913–1996) trace the use of the tune and lyrics in other songs and poems, including:
<li> "Red House," first published in 1695 by John Playford (1623–1686/7) in The Dancing Master (9th ed.)
 Aka:
 "Where will Our Good Man Lay?"
 "Where/Whar Wad Our Gudman/Bonny Annie Lye/Laye"
<li> "Where/Whar wad our Guidman Lie"
 "Where Will Our Goodman Laye," published in Oswald's Caledonian Pocket Companion for the Flute (Vol. 2) (c. 1750), published by James Oswald (1710–1769)
 From the 1729 opera, Polly, Act I, Scene VIII, Air 9, the song "Red House," being the same version published in The Dancing Master
<li> "Address to the Woodlark," by Robert Burns (1759–1796)
<li> "0! What Can Make My Annie Sigh?" by John Anderson
<li> The words, "Where wad bonny Anne lye?," in the song, "The Cordial," sung to the tune "Where Should Our Goodman Ly?"
 Published 1 January 1724, in Allan Ramsay's Tea-Table Miscellany: Or A Collection of Choice Songs, Scots and English (11th ed.) (Vol. 1 of 4)
 English-turned-American composer Austen Herbert Croom-Johnson (1909–1964), born in Hereford, imported the tune, "D'ye ken John Peel," and scored it for a 1939 jingle, "Pepsi-Cola Hits the Spot" (aka "Nickel, Nickel"). His Chicago-born lyricist partner, Alan Bradley Kent (né Karl Dewitt Byington, Jr.; 1912–1991), wrote the words.

 
 goodman = husband
 guidman = form of address, typically between people of equal rank who are not on familiar terms (also gudman, gudeman, goodman, and more)
 bonnie = pretty, attractive
 air = aria or song
 ken = to be aware of or to know

Lyrics 
Verse 1 (best known; by Graves)
D'ye ken John Peel with his coat so gay?‡
D'ye ken John Peel at the break o' day?
D'ye ken John Peel when he's far, far a-way.
With his hounds and his horn in the morning? 

Chorus
 For the sound of his horn brought me from my bed,
 And the cry of his hounds which he oft time led,
 Peel's "View, Halloo!" could awaken the dead,
 Or the fox from his lair in the morning. 

‡Some versions, according to The Oxford Dictionary of Quotations, show the phrase as " with his coat so gray," implying that his coat was likely made of local Herdwick wool, commonly gray. If so, the color of John Peel's coat would be in contrast to that of other huntsmen – traditionally brightly colored, often red or hunting pink.

Additional verses
Verse 2 (Coward's version)
D'ye ken that bitch whose tongue was death?
D'ye ken her sons of peerless faith?
D'ye ken that fox, with his last breath
Curs’d them all as he died in the morning?
 For the sound of his horn, etc.

Verse 3
Yes I ken John Peel and Ruby too
Ranter and Royal and Bellman as true,*
From the drag to the chase, from the chase to the view
From a view to the death in the morning
For the sound of his horn, etc.

Verse 4
And I've followed John Peel both often and far,
O'er the rasper fence and the gate and the bar,
From low Denton Holme up to Scratchmere Scar,
Where we vie for the brush in the morning
 For the sound of his horn, etc.

Verse 5
Then here's to John Peel with my heart and soul
Come fill – fill to him another strong bowl,
And we'll follow John Peel through fair and through foul
While we’re waked by his horn in the morning.
 For the sound of his horn, etc.

*These were the real names of the hounds that Peel, in his old age, said were the very best he ever had or saw. – J.W.G.

Alternative versions
As is common with songs often sung from memory, this has been recorded with other verses and minor differences in lyrics, such as in the third verse: "From the drag to the chase, from the chase to the view" and "From a view to a death in the morning":

Alternative verse 1
Yes, I ken John Peel and his Ruby, too!
Ranter and Ringwood, Bellman so true!
From a find to a check, from a check to a view,
From a view to a kill in the morning.
 For the sound of his hor', etc. 

Coward's version of the last line was used for Matt Cartmill's book, A View to a Death in the Morning: Hunting and Nature Through History.  The alternative version was used as a title to the short story From a View to A Kill, found in the Ian Fleming collection of short stories, For Your Eyes Only.  This was in turn shortened to A View to a Kill, when applied to the fourteenth James Bond movie.

This verse was not in Coward's version:

Alternative verse 2
D'ye ken John Peel with his coat so gay?
He liv'd at Troutbeck once on a day;
Now he has gone far, away;
We shall ne'er hear his voice in the morning.
 For the sound of his horn, etc.

Parodies 
A number of parodies also exist. On BBC radio's I'm Sorry I'll Read That Again, a version parodied the British Radio DJ John Peel

1st parody
D'ye ken John Peel with his voice so grey?
He sounds as if he's far far away;
He sends you to sleep at the end of the day;
'til you're woken up by Tony Blackburn in the morning. 

Another was used in the 1979 film Porridge, which saw Ronnie Barker as Fletch cheekily observe a new prison warden.

2nd parody
D'ye see yon screw with his look so vain?
With his brand new key on his brand new chain;
With a face like a ferret and a pea for a brain
 And his hand on his whistle in the morning. 

Several lines of the song are also parodied in the course of James Joyce's Finnegans Wake.

Regimental marches 
 "John Peel" was one of the quick marches of the King's Own Royal Border Regiment before it merged in 2004 with the Queen's Lancashire Regiment and the King's Regiment to become the Duke of Lancaster's Regiment.
 "John Peel" was the march of the 1st Cumberland Artillery Volunteers.
 "John Peel" is the authorized Regimental March (dismounted) of The Lorne Scots (Peel, Dufferin and Halton Regiment) and The Ontario Regiment (RCAC) of the Canadian Forces.
 "John Peel" is the regimental march of the Queen's Own Yeomanry, an armoured formation reconnaissance regiment of the British Army.

Wedgwood 
Wedgwood's creamware pitcher modelled with hunting scenes in low relief and with a handle modelled as a leaping hound, which was introduced in 1912, carried the pattern name "D'ye Ken John Peel".

Selected audio and discography 

 Robert Radford (1874–1933), bass vocalist
 With orchestra and chorus
 Recorded April 1907
 "D'ye ken John Peel"
 Gramophone Concert Record G.C.-3-2798
 Matrix runout (Side A): Ho 2861ab

 University of Pennsylvania Glee Club, Fall 2018
 "D'ye ken John Peel?"
 (audio via YouTube)

 Peter Dawson (1882–1961), English baritone
 With chorus and orchestra
 Recorded 1918
 Side B: "D'ye ken John Peel"
 Zonophone Record – The Twin™ 1841
 British Zonophone Co., Ltd., England
 Matrix runout (Side B label): X-3-42886
 (audio via YouTube)
 

 Tune Twisters
 "Pepsi-Cola Hits the Spot" (1939)
 (audio via YouTube)

 King's Own Royal Border Regiment
 "John Peel," quick march
 (audio via YouTube)

 Queen's Own Yeomanry
 "D'ye ken John Peel," quick march of the regiment
 (audio via YouTube)

 Band of H.M. Coldstream Guards (28 March 2018)
 "D'ye ken John Peel"
 (audio via YouTube)

 
 Anita Boyer (née Anita Blanche Boyer; 1915–1985), vocalist
 Both sides recorded December 1941, New York
 Side A: "Swinging the Jingle"
 Austen Croom Johnson (music, American version)
 Alan Kent (words)
 Helmy Kresa (orchestra arrangement)
 Side B: "Get Hep"
 Bissell Palmer (né Bissell Barbour Palmer; 1889–1968) (words)
 Helmy Kresa (orchestra arrangement)
 Nocturne Records (fictitious label of Pepsi-Cola)
 Matrix runout (Side A): 3135 A-1
 Matrix runout (Side B): 3135 B-1
 ("Swinging the Jingle" via YouTube)
 ("Get Hep" via YouTube)
P.M.Adamson Download sites and youtube

Extant old publications 
 "D'ye ken John Peel," hunting song; words by John Woodcock Graves, music by William Metcalfe, London: J.B. Cramer & Co.; Carlisle: W. Metcalfe (1869); series: The Songs and Ballads of Cumberland (alternate link) (No. 1); ;

Copyrights 

Catalog of Copyright Entries, Part 3: Musical Compositions

<li> 
 © 27 June 1913; E316233
 Hawkes & Son, London
 (copyright is claimed on arrangement)
 New Series, Vol. 8, Part 3, p. 792
 ; 

<li>"John Peel," variations on an English tune
 Hubert Crook, of Great Britain; pf.
 Cover title: "D'ye ken John Peel"
 
 A. Hammond & Co., London
 New Series, Vol. 20, No. 1 (1926) p. 76
 ;

Copyrights relating to Pepsi-Cola 

Catalog of Copyright Entries, Part 3: Musical Compositions

 1939 Pepsi-Cola jingle

 "D'ye ken John Peel"
 
 1 copy; 12 January 1938; EU157880
 ABC Music Corporation, New York
 
 Published by Chappell & Co. (4º)
 ; 
 "Do ye ken, John Peel?"
 
 
 1 copy; 24 February 1938; EU161663
 Irving Berlin, Inc., New York
 
 29 July 1965; R365626
 Margaret Mary LeLange (né Margaret Mary Lohden; 1918–1990) (widow)
 
 "Do ye ken, John Peel?"
 
 
 1 copy; 16 March 1938; EP68157
 Irving Berlin, Inc., New York
 
 29 July 1965; R365625
  Margaret Mary LeLange (widow)
 
 "Do ye ken John Peel," fox trot
 
 © 14 April 1938; EP70500
 Irving Berlin, Inc., New York
 
 "Pepsi-Cola Hits the Spot"
 ©1939 by Johnson-Siday
 (Austen Croom Johnson & Eric Siday)
 (copyright source not found)
 "Pepsi-Cola Radio Jingle"
  
  1 copy; 2 January 1940; EP162049
 (original copyright source not found)
 7 April 1967; R407224
  PepsiCo, Inc. (formerly Pepsi-Cola Co.)
 
 "Get Hep"
 
 9 October 1941; EP98040
 Pepsi-Cola Company of Long Island City, New York
 

 New theme
 "Pepsi-Cola Hits the Spot"
 Words and adaptation of music of the Pepsi-Cola Co.
 NM: Adaptation and revised words
 ©Pepsi-Cola Co.
 1 March 1965; EU867255

Copyrights relating to wind ensembles 

Catalog of Copyright Entries, Part 3: Musical Compositions

 
 Arranged by C.V. Wright, London
 Parts
 (Popular Marches for Military Band and Brass Band)
 NM: Arrangement
 Hawkes & Son, London, Ltd.
 9 December 1960; EF0-76517
 

 
 EF = Music published abroad
 EP = Class E (musical composition), published
 UP = Class E (musical composition), unpublished
 R = Copyright renewal
 NM = New matter

See also 
 D'Ye Ken John Peel? a 1935 film
 Bellman and True, a 1987 film starring Bernard Hill, uses the lyrics to describe the various duties of bankrobbers (i.e., a Bellman, in the vernacular of the London underworld, is a person who "fixes" alarms). A version of the song plays during the closing credits, sung by Lonnie Donegan.

Notes and references

Notes

References

External links 

 An arrangement of the tune
 The Olde John Peel Inn public house

English folk songs
Songs about hunters
John Peel
17th-century songs
18th-century songs
19th-century songs
20th-century songs
21st-century songs
Cumbrian folklore
Songs used as jingles
1820s songs
Lake District in fiction